D.I.E. Again - Death Investigation Extension II (Traditional Chinese: 古靈精探B) is a TVB modern comedy-action series. It stars Roger Kwok , Sonija Kwok , Nancy Wu , Edwin Siu , Derek Kok, Kwok Fung , Rain Lau , Mimi Lo, Kitty Yuen & Jess Shum.

The series is a sequel to D.I.E. (古靈精探) aired in 2008. Filming began in November as stated by Roger Kwok on his blog.

Synopsis
Although D.I.E had been dissolved and the officers returned to their previous departments, their odd habits continue to follow them, resulting in many troubles for the police force. The senior staff decide to bring the D.I.E back, this time headed by Lo Sir, Yue Sir's former supervisor. Yue Sir and Jing Jing have a baby boy and Jing jing returns to work after trying to be a housewife to no avail. Initially working with the homicide unit again, she is still always chasing Dai-Hau-Ying, and after several incidents is sent back to D.I.E. Ying seems to have become less evil than before, but Jing jing continues to attempt arrest, much to the chagrin of her supervisors.

Lo Sir's daughter Lo Pak Chi admires Jing jing and follow her into D.I.E. Yue Sir's father and sister left Hong Kong, leaving Zheng-Yee alone and he gradually develops an affection for Pui pui, Jing Jing's younger sister. Together the two face breakups, illness, attacks, and Pui pui's rise to fame as she becomes a celebrity-dancer-model in Kam Ji Fung's entertainment company. This sequence has a lot of focus on the political ways within entertainment industries, and has a few episodes showing visits into TVB city. Baby Yue has special powers just like his daddy as well.

Cast

The Yue Family

The Ying Family

D.I.E. (Death Investigation Extension) Unit

Other Cast

Awards and nominations
TVB Anniversary Awards (2009)
 Best Drama
 Best Actor (Roger Kwok)
 Best Actress (Sonija Kwok)
 Best Supporting Actor (Derek Kok)
 My Favourite Male Character (Roger Kwok)
 My Favourite Female Character (Sonija Kwok)

Viewership ratings

References

External links
TVB.com D.I.E. Again - Official Website 

TVB dramas
2009 Hong Kong television series debuts
2009 Hong Kong television series endings